Stathis Karamalikis (born 4 December 1981) is a Greek professional football striker currently playing for Zakynthos.

References

External links
Profile at epae.org
Stats Player

1981 births
Living people
People from Zakynthos
Greek footballers
Levadiakos F.C. players
Ethnikos Piraeus F.C. players
Thrasyvoulos F.C. players
Panetolikos F.C. players
Apollon Smyrnis F.C. players
Greek expatriate footballers
Expatriate footballers in Cyprus
Association football forwards
Sportspeople from the Ionian Islands (region)